Sigurd Rasmussen (1 February 1892 – 27 September 1974) was a Norwegian footballer. He played in four matches for the Norway national football team from 1912 to 1917.

References

External links
 

1892 births
1974 deaths
Norwegian footballers
Norway international footballers
Place of birth missing
Association footballers not categorized by position